2009–10 FIBA EuroChallenge was the seventh edition of Europe's third-tier level transnational men's professional club basketball FIBA EuroChallenge Tournament, organized by FIBA Europe.

Teams

Regular season
The Regular Season begins from November 24, 2009.

Group A

Group B

Group C

Group D

Group E

Group F

Group G

Group H

Last 16

Group I

Group J

Group K

Group L

Quarterfinals
The quarterfinals were played in a best-of-three playoff format. The winners of the groups in the top 16 hosted game one and three (if possible).

|}

Final Four
The Final Four was held from 30 April until 2 May and was hosted at the Lokhalle in Göttingen, Germany.

External links
 FIBA Europe
 European Basketball Website

2009
Euro